Beşiktepe can refer to:

 Beşiktepe, Alaca
 Beşiktepe, Göynücek